David Karl Brandl (born 19 April 1987) is an Austrian swimmer, who specialized in freestyle events. He is a multiple-time Austrian champion, a four-time national record holder, and a current member of Perger Swimming Club in Perg. He also won a bronze medal, as a member of the Austrian swimming team, at the 2008 European Championships in Eindhoven, Netherlands.

Swimming career
Brandl qualified for the men's 400 m freestyle at the 2008 Summer Olympics in Beijing, by attaining a B-standard entry time of 3:51.35 from the Austrian Swimming Championships, coincidentally in his home city Linz. He won the second heat by twenty-one hundredths of a second (0.21) ahead of France's Sébastien Rouault, with an Austrian record-breaking time of 3:48.63. Brandl, however, failed to advance into the final, as he placed twentieth out of 37 swimmers in the evening preliminaries. Three days later, Brandl swam on the second leg of the men's 4 × 200 m freestyle relay, recording his fastest individual-split time of 1:46.45. Brandl and his teammates Markus Rogan, Dominik Koll, and Florian Janistyn finished heat two in fifth place and ninth overall, for another Austrian record time of 7:11.45.

At the 2009 FINA World Championships in Rome, Italy, Brandl set an Austrian record in the 400 m freestyle, lowering his time to 3:47.61. The following year, Brandl achieved a fifth-place finish in the same event at the 2010 European Short Course Swimming Championships in Eindhoven, Netherlands, posting his best career time of 3:44.33.

At the 2011 FINA World Championships in Shanghai, China, Brandl competed in two long-distance freestyle events, but achieved a slightly fair swimming performance. He finished twenty-fifth in the 400 m freestyle, and twenty-second in the 800 m freestyle, posting his slowest possible time of 3:54.73 and 8:05.66, respectively.

Four years after competing in his first Olympics, Brandl qualified for his second Austrian team, as a 25-year-old, at the 2012 Summer Olympics in London, by attaining a B-standard time of 1:48.95 in the men's 200 m freestyle. He challenged seven other competitors on the third heat of his only individual event, including Canada's Blake Worsley and Israel's Nimrod Shapira Bar-Or. He came only in fifth place by 0.68 of a second ahead of Tunisia's Ahmed Mathlouthi, with a time of 1:49.00. Brandl, however, failed to advance into the semifinals, as he placed twenty-seventh out of 41 swimmers in the morning's preliminary heats. Two days later, Brandl reunited with his teammates Rogan, Janistyn, and Christian Scherübl for the men's 4 × 200 m freestyle relay. Swimming the lead-off leg, Brandl recorded a time of 1:49.80, and the Austrian team went on to finish heat two in eighth place and sixteenth overall, for a total time of 7:17.94.

References

External links

NBC Olympics Profile

1987 births
Living people
Austrian male freestyle swimmers
Olympic swimmers of Austria
Swimmers at the 2008 Summer Olympics
Swimmers at the 2012 Summer Olympics
Swimmers at the 2016 Summer Olympics
Sportspeople from Linz
European Aquatics Championships medalists in swimming
20th-century Austrian people
21st-century Austrian people